Nelson Alberto Aguiar Ramírez  is a Cuban dissident. He was arrested and sentenced to 13 years in jail during the Black Spring in 2003. Amnesty International declared him a prisoner of conscience. He is president of the unofficial Partido Ortodoxo de Cuba (Cuban Orthodox Party).

He is an electrician by trade.

References

External links
 Síntesis biográfica de Nelson Aguiar Ramírez at Payolibre.com

See also
 Black Spring (Cuba)

Amnesty International prisoners of conscience held by Cuba
Cuban dissidents
Cuban democracy activists
Living people
Political prisoners
Cuban prisoners and detainees
Year of birth missing (living people)